LaPorte High School is a public high school located in LaPorte, Indiana. It is a part of the LaPorte Community School Corporation.

Notable alumni 

 Dorothy Claire
 Miles Taylor
 Ashley Hinshaw

See also
 List of high schools in Indiana

References

External links
 Official Website

 

 Public high schools in Indiana
 Buildings and structures in LaPorte County, Indiana